Brokdorf Nuclear Power Plant (German: Kernkraftwerk Brokdorf, or KBR) is a Power Plant close to the municipality of Brokdorf in Steinburg, Schleswig-Holstein, Germany that shut down on New Year's Eve 2021.

It started in October 1986 by a first-of-its-kind joint venture between PreussenElektra AG and Hamburgische Electricitäts-Werke, since 2002 part of Vattenfall. During the construction phase in the 1970s and 1980s there were violent protests against nuclear power at the location.

Vattenfall Europe Nuclear Energy GmbH owns 20% and PreussenElektra GmbH owns 80% of the plant.

The plant is a pressurized water reactor with uranium dioxide fuel elements, which are used in degrees of enrichment of 1.9%, 2.5% and 3.5%.  It also uses MOX fuel. There are 193 fuel assemblies In the reactor, with a total heavy-metal weight of 103 tons.  The power station has a thermal output of 3765 MW, as well as an electrical output of 1440 MW. It belongs to the 3rd PWR generation  in Germany. With a net generation of just under 12 billion kWh, it was the worldwide leader in 2005.

In May 2021, the 1,400 MW HVDC subsea power cable NordLink between Norway and Germany's Wilster substation near Brokdorf was opened. With almost the same transmission power, Norwegian hydro power can replace Brokdorf nuclear power, or surplus German renewable power can help Norway save hydro power. As planned since 2011 in the German nuclear phase out, the Brokdorf plant was shut down on 31 December 2021.

See also

Anti-nuclear movement in Germany

References

External links

Former nuclear power stations in Germany
Vattenfall nuclear power stations
Economy of Schleswig-Holstein
Steinburg